Jin Ho-eun is a South Korean actor. He is known for his roles in dramas such as Beautiful Love, Wonderful Life, The Secret of Secret, To My Beautiful Woo Ri and All of Us Are Dead.

Filmography

Film

Television series

Web series

Music video appearances

References

External links 
 
 

2000 births
Living people
21st-century South Korean male actors
South Korean male television actors
South Korean male film actors